William Charles Chatfield (1851 – 30 May 1930) was a New Zealand architect. He was born in Sussex and educated in Brixton, Surrey. He moved to New Zealand at the age of 16. In 1886 he designed the Te Aro Opera House which was located at 73 Manners Street. Two of his remaining buildings are the Star Boating Club and the Stewart Dawson's Building.

Chatfield died on 30 May 1930 aged 79.

References 

1851 births
1930 deaths
New Zealand architects
English emigrants to New Zealand